7/8 may refer to:

 July 8 (month-day date notation)
 7 August (day-month date notation)
 the Fraction seven eighths or 0.875 in decimal
 the  time signature; see Septuple meter
 7/8 TV (Bulgarian TV channel)